A lark is a small terrestrial bird.

Lark, The Lark, Larks or The Larks may also refer to:

Geography 
 Lark, Utah, United States, a ghost town
 Lark, Wisconsin, United States, an unincorporated community
 Lark Street, Albany, New York, United States
 River Lark, a river in England
 Lark Lane, Liverpool, England
 Lark Wood, a biological Site of Special Scientific Interest in Gloucestershire, England
 Lark or Larak Island, in the Persian Gulf off the coast of Iran

Arts and entertainment

Music
 The Larks, an influential American vocal group active in the 1950s
 Lark (band), an electronica band from South Africa
 "The Lark", nickname given to String Quartet No. 53 in D major, Op. 64, No. 5, by Joseph Haydn
 "The Lark", composed by Mikhail Glinka
 "The Lark" or "Ciocârlia", composed by Angheluş Dinicu
 Lark (album), a 1972 album by Linda Lewis

Films
 The Lark (1958 film), an Australian TV adaptation of Jean Anouilh's play (see below)
 The Lark (1964 film), a Soviet film
 The Lark (2007 film), a British film

Fictional characters
 Miss Lark, a recurring character in the Mary Poppins book series
 Lady Lark, a Marvel Comics character
 Lark, from the PlayStation 2 game Devil Kings
 Lark, from the Nintendo 64 game Pilotwings 64

Plays
 The Lark (play), a 1952 play about Joan of Arc by Jean Anouilh

In the military
 , sixteen Royal Navy ships
 Hired armed lugger Lark, used by the Royal Navy from 1799 to 1801
 , two US Navy ships
 CSS Lark, a Confederate paddle steamer and blockade runner during the American Civil War
 SAM-N-2 Lark, an early U.S. Navy anti-aircraft missile
 Lark (Norwegian resistance), a Second World War group sent into German-occupied Norway to prepare for a possible Allied invasion

Transportation 
 Studebaker Lark, a compact car built by Studebaker in the 1950s and early 1960s
 Lark (passenger train), a passenger train operated by the Southern Pacific Railroad
 Lark, a South Devon Railway 0-4-0 steam locomotive
 Curtiss Model 41 Lark, a commercial biplane introduced in 1925
 Keleher Lark, a single-seat aerobatic sport aircraft designed in the early 1960s
 Lark (dinghy), a two-person racing dinghy
 MV Larks, a former name of the ferry MV Lucky Star (1976)

Sports 
 Denver Larks, a former name of the Denver Nuggets National Basketball Association team
 Larks, a nickname for the Montreal Alouettes Canadian Football League team
 Hays Larks, a collegiate summer baseball team in Hays, Kansas
 Jersey Larks, a professional ice hockey team which played in the Eastern Hockey League during the 1960–61 season
 Oakland Larks, a baseball team in the West Coast Negro Baseball League in 1946
 Mynavi ABC Championship, a Japan Golf Tour event called the ABC Lark Cup (1988-1991) and the Lark Cup (1992-1993)

People 
 Lark (name), a list of people with either the surname or given name
 Lark (person), someone who prefers to get up early in the morning and go to bed in the early evening
 Sarah Lark, a pen name of German author Christiane Gohl (born 1958)
 Lark O'Neal, a pen name of American novelist Barbara O'Neal (fl. 1990-present)
K. Gordon Lark, American biologist

Other uses 
 Lark (cigarette), a brand of cigarette made by Philip Morris
 Lark Theater, a single-screen Art Deco cinema in Larkspur, California, United States
 Lark Hotels, an American hotel management and development company
 Lark, an XML syntax analyzer written by Tim Bray
 Colloquial for a larrikin act
 Lark (software), collaborative software
 The Lark (theater), a New York-based new play theater organization
 Lark (restaurant), a restaurant in Seattle

See also 
 Lark Force, a Second World War Australian Army unit
 SAI KZ VII Lærke (Danish for "Lark"), a light utility aircraft first flown in 1946
 "An Awhesyth" (Cornish for "The Lark"), a traditional Cornish folk song
 Alouette (disambiguation) (French for "lark")
 LARC (disambiguation)